Dost (alternatively Dhosth or Dosth) may refer to:

Films 
 Dost (1944 film), a Hindi film
 Dost (1954 film), a Hindi film
 Dost (1974 film), a Hindi film
 Dost (1989 film), a Hindi film
 Dhosth (2001 Malayalam film)
 Dost (2001 Tamil film)
 Dost (2004 film), a Telugu film

People 
 Dost Mohammad (disambiguation), several people
 Dost (surname), list of people with the surname

Acronyms 
 Democrats for Responsibility, Solidarity and Tolerance (ДОСТ/DOST), political party in Bulgaria
 Dictionary of the Older Scottish Tongue
 Department of Science and Technology (Philippines)
 Degree Online Services Telangana, a degree admission process in Telangana, India

Other uses 
 'Dost''' (singular), a term used in Hindi, Urdu and Turkish for 'friend'

 Dost test, a six-factor child pornography guideline established in the case United States v. Dost in 1996
 Dost TV, a privately held thematic TV channel in Turkey
 Ashok Leyland Dost, a light commercial vehicle made by joint venture between  Ashok Leyland and Nissan

 See also 

 
 
 Dostana (disambiguation)
Thou, for the archaic form thou dost'' meaning "you do"